Javier Moracho Torrente (born August 18, 1957, in Monzón, Huesca) is a retired hurdler from Spain.

He won the European Indoor Championships in 1986 and a silver medal at the inaugural World Indoor Games in 1985. He finished seventh at the 1980 Olympics.

Moracho's personal best time was 13.42 seconds, achieved in August 1987 in Barcelona. The Spanish record currently belongs to the former Ecuadorian Jackson Quiñónez with 13.34 seconds. Furthermore, another Spanish hurdler Felipe Vivancos has run in 13.41 seconds.

International competitions

References

1957 births
Living people
Spanish male hurdlers
Athletes (track and field) at the 1980 Summer Olympics
Athletes (track and field) at the 1984 Summer Olympics
Athletes (track and field) at the 1988 Summer Olympics
Olympic athletes of Spain
People from Cinca Medio
Sportspeople from the Province of Huesca
Mediterranean Games gold medalists for Spain
Mediterranean Games bronze medalists for Spain
Mediterranean Games medalists in athletics
Athletes (track and field) at the 1979 Mediterranean Games
Athletes (track and field) at the 1983 Mediterranean Games
World Athletics Indoor Championships medalists